Actinopus nigripes is a species of mygalomorph spiders in the family Actinopodidae. It is found in Brazil.

References

nigripes
Spiders described in 1834